The Indian General Election, 2014 polls in Meghalaya for two Lok Sabha seats will be held in a single phase on 9 April 2014.

Opinion polling

Election schedule

Constituency wise Election schedule are given below –

Results
As per the results declared on 16 May 2014, the Indian National Congress candidate Vincent Pala secured the Shillong Lok Sabha seat while the National Peoples Party candidate Purno Agitok Sangma won the Tura seat.

Constituency wise

References

Indian general elections in Meghalaya
2010s in Meghalaya
Meghalaya